Ophiolepididae are a family of brittle stars of the suborder Ophiurina. It includes both deep-sea and shallow-water species.

Systematics and phylogeny
The fossils of Ophiolepididae date back to the Anisian age of the Middle Triassic. The family includes the following living genera:
Amphipholizona
Aspidophiura
Ophiolepis
Ophiomaria
Ophiomidas
Ophiomusa
Ophioplinthus
Ophiothyreus
Ophiotrochus
Ophiozonoida
Ophiuroconis
Ophiurodon

References

Ophiurida
Extant Early Cretaceous first appearances